Muhammad ibn Khalid al-Qasri was a son of the famed Khalid al-Qasri, the longtime (724–738) governor of Iraq for the Umayyads.

During the Abbasid Revolution, he participated in the uprising at Kufa at the approach of the Abbasid army, and later was appointed governor of Mecca, Medina, and Ta'if by the Abbasid caliph al-Mansur.

References

Sources 
 

8th-century Arabs
Governors of the Abbasid Caliphate
People of the Abbasid Revolution
Abbasid governors of Mecca
Abbasid governors of Medina
8th-century people from the Abbasid Caliphate